Da'an is a city of northwestern Jilin province in Northeast China, on the southern bank of the Songhua River and the border with Heilongjiang province.

Administrative divisions
There are five subdistricts, 10 towns, 16 townships, and one ethnic township.

Subdistricts:
Anbei Subdistrict, Jinhua Subdistrict, Linjiang Subdistrict, Huiyang Subdistrict, Changhong Subdistrict

Towns:
Yueliangpao, Anchang, Fengshou, Xinping'an, Liangjiazi, Sheli, Dagangzi, Chagan, Longzhao

Townships:
Sikeshu Township, Lianhe Township, Taishan Township, Sidawa Township, Lesheng Township, Xinhuang Township, Dalai Township, Honggangzi Township, Tongjian Township, Laifu Township, Liuhe Township, Gucheng Township, Shaoguozhen Township, Dayushu Township, Haituo Township, Jingshan Township, Xin'aili Mongol Ethnic Township

Climate

References

External links

 
County-level divisions of Jilin